Andrew Jung (born 8 October 1997) is a French professional footballer who plays as a forward for  club Quevilly-Rouen, on loan from Belgian First Division A club Oostende.

Career
Jung made his professional debut with Reims in a 3–0 Ligue 2 loss to Nîmes on 25 November 2016. On 15 January 2019, he signed a professional contract with Reims while on loan with Concarneau.

On 17 June 2019, Jung signed for Châteauroux on a two-year contract. He made his debut as a second-half substitute in a 0–0 draw against Rodez in Ligue 2 on 2 August 2019.

Jung returned to Concarneau for a second loan spell in January 2020. In June 2020 he signed a contract extension with Châteauroux until 2022, and joined Quevilly-Rouen on loan for the 2020–21 season. After heading the scoring chart with 21 goals, he was named Championnat National player of the season.

On 27 July 2021, Jung signed for Belgian club Oostende on a four-year contract. The transfer fee paid to Châteauroux was reportedly of €900,000. He was immediately loaned out to affiliate club Nancy.

On 31 August 2022, Jung returned to Quevilly-Rouen on a new loan.

References

External links
 
 

1997 births
Living people
People from Remiremont
Association football forwards
French footballers
Championnat National 3 players
Ligue 2 players
Championnat National 2 players
Championnat National players
Stade de Reims players
US Concarneau players
LB Châteauroux players
US Quevilly-Rouen Métropole players
K.V. Oostende players
AS Nancy Lorraine players
Expatriate footballers in Belgium
French expatriate footballers
French expatriate sportspeople in Belgium
Sportspeople from Vosges (department)
Footballers from Grand Est